The Piraeus Painter was one of the first Attic black-figure vase painters. He was active between 630 and 600 BC.

The Piraeus Painter was a contemporary of the Nessos Painter, whose importance and artistic class he did not reach. His name vase, a neck amphora in Athens, National Archaeological Museum 353, was found at Piraeus. The most noteworthy feature of that vase is the snout of the depicted lion, stylised into the shape of a volute. Images of lions were quite popular at the time, as in the works of the Lion Painter and the Gorgon Painter. Except his animal figures, which display a safe intuition for design and proportions, his other figures appear very stiff and awkward.

Bibliography 
 John Beazley: Attic Black-figure Vase-painters. Oxford 1956, p. 2-3.
 John Boardman: Schwarzfigurige Vasen aus Athen. Ein Handbuch, von Zabern, 4. Edn., Mainz 1994 (Kulturgeschichte der Antiken Welt, Vol 1) , p. 18.

7th-century BC births
600s BC deaths
Year of death unknown
Ancient Greek vase painters
7th-century BC Greek people